Central North Carolina, also known as the Piedmont, is a region of North Carolina. It is located between the Mountains to the west and the Coastal Plain to the east. It is the most populous region of the state, containing Charlotte, the state capital of Raleigh, and Greensboro. These cities form the Piedmont Crescent region, much of which parallels I-85. The geography of the Piedmont primarily consists of rolling hills. Historically the region has been known for furniture and textile manufacturing.

Geography

The geography of Central North Carolina consists primarily of rolling hills with elevations generally between 300 and 1500 feet above sea level, generally sloping upward from east to west. There are some smaller mountain ranges, such as the Uwharrie Mountains. Many rivers cross the region, such as the Neuse, Cape Fear, and Pee Dee. The approximate eastern border of the Piedmont is the Fall Line, where many of these rivers have waterfalls. This was historically important as a good location for water mills, and it was the upper limit of navigability on these rivers. Some gold, coal, and iron has been found in the region. The land was historically covered with oak, hickory, and pine forests. Much of this forest has been destroyed due to agriculture and urban development, but some forests have regrown due to the abandonment of farms.

Climate
Central North Carolina has a temperate climate, with abundant precipitation year-round. Most of the region  of precipitation, less than either the Mountains or Coastal Plain. The region is frequently affected by the remnants of hurricanes. Hurricane Fran caused significant damage in the region. The Tornado outbreak of April 14-16, 2011 caused significant damage in this region as well as further east.

Transportation

Highways
Several major interstates cross the region.

Interstate 40 crosses the region from Hickory in the west to Clayton in the east
Interstate 85 crosses the region from Kings Mountain in the southwest to Norlina in the northeast
Interstate 77 crosses the region from Charlotte in the south to Mount Airy in the north
Interstate 95 runs roughly parallel to the eastern border of the region

In addition, two major interstates are under construction in the western portion of the region
Interstate 73
Interstate 74

Cities in each of the major metropolitan areas also have auxiliary routes

Charlotte has:
Interstate 277
Interstate 485

Raleigh has:
Interstate 440
Interstate 540

Greensboro has:
Interstate 840 (under construction)
Interstate 785

Railroads
Amtrak runs passenger service through Central North Carolina. The Piedmont and Carolinian trains run from Raleigh to Charlotte, and other trains connect northeast to Washington, D.C. and southwest to Atlanta.

Airports
There are three major passenger airports in Central North Carolina.
Charlotte Douglas International Airport
Raleigh-Durham International Airport
Piedmont Triad International Airport

Demographics
The majority of North Carolina's population, and each of its five largest cities, is located in the Piedmont.

Cities and towns

Over 100,000 inhabitants
Charlotte
Raleigh
Greensboro
Durham
Winston-Salem
Cary
High Point
Concord

Over 20,000 inhabitants
Gastonia
Apex
Huntersville
Chapel Hill
Burlington
Kannapolis
Mooresville
Wake Forest
Hickory
Holly Springs
Indian Trail
Fuquay Varina
Salisbury
Monroe
Garner
Cornelius
Morrisville
Sanford
Matthews
Statesville
Clayton (also in Eastern North Carolina)
Thomasville
Asheboro
Kernersville
Mint Hill
Shelby
Waxhaw
Clemmons
Carrboro

See also
Piedmont (United States)
Piedmont Crescent

References

Regions of North Carolina